Walong Advanced Landing Ground  is an Indian Air Force airstrip located at Walong on the banks of Lohit River in Anjaw District of Arunachal Pradesh, India. It is nearly 50 km north of district headquarter at Hawai, nearly 30 km south of India-China LAC (near Kaho village), and 70 km southwest of Diphu Pass near India-China-Myanmar tri-junction.

History

The airstrip was in operation during 1962 Indo-China War and was later abandoned. In 2013 plan was initiated for the revival of the airstrip. The project was completed in a record 21 months time period and declared open on 23 October 2015.

See also

 Military bases 
 List of ALGs
 List of Indian Air Force stations
 India-China military deployment on LAC
 List of disputed India-China areas

 Borders
 Line of Actual Control (LAC)
 Borders of China
 Borders of India
 
 Conflicts
 Sino-Indian conflict
 List of disputed territories of China
 List of disputed territories of India

 Other related topics
 India-China Border Roads
 List of extreme points of India
 Defence Institute of High Altitude Research

References

External links 
 IAF's ALG

Anjaw district
Airports in Arunachal Pradesh
Indian Air Force bases
Airports with year of establishment missing